Daryl Taylor (born 21 May 1966)  is an Australian wheelchair basketball player. He was born in Adelaide, South Australia.  He was part of the silver medal-winning Australia men's national wheelchair basketball team at the 2004 Summer Paralympics.

References

Paralympic silver medalists for Australia
Wheelchair category Paralympic competitors
Wheelchair basketball players at the 2004 Summer Paralympics
Paralympic wheelchair basketball players of Australia
Living people
Medalists at the 2004 Summer Paralympics
1966 births
Paralympic medalists in wheelchair basketball